The 2010–11 season was West Bromwich Albion's fifth season in the Premier League. Albion return to the Premier League after being promoted from the Championship. West Brom confirmed their promotion back to the Premier League on 10 April 2010 after a 3–2 win over Doncaster Rovers, and retained their new top-flight status, finishing 11th.

Background
During the off-season, West Bromwich Albion made a number of improvements to their home ground, The Hawthorns. The club reseeded the playing surface and repainted the exterior of the stadium. The memorial garden, situated behind the East Stand car park, was extended, while additional lighting, new flooring and more turnstiles were added to the Smethwick End.

Players

First team squad

Left club during season

Player statistics

 * Player left club during the season.

Transfers

Summer transfers in

Summer transfers out

Loan in

Loan out

Results

Pre-season

Premier League

League Cup

FA Cup

See also

West Bromwich Albion F.C. seasons
2010–11 Premier League

Notes

References

West Bromwich Albion F.C. seasons
West Bromwich Albion